A Förderndes Mitglied der SS (SS-FM; SS Patron Members) was a member of the Allgemeine SS (General SS) who did not take part in active duty, but instead contributed financially to the SS. The SS-FM was organised by the SS Main Economic and Administrative Office, and started in 1926. Members of the SS-FM made monthly payments towards the work of the SS at their local SS headquarters. For people with low income, contributions were low; no minimum contribution was prescribed. Each member was issued with a lapel pin and a receipt book. From April 1934, members also received a monthly magazine - FM-Zeitschrift- which was produced by the SS High Command. By 1939, circulation of FM-Zeitschrift was approximately 365,000, but few copies of the magazine survive today.

References

 
Nazi Party organizations